Bangladesh Marine Academy is a regimental and residential maritime training institute for developing Merchant Marine Nautical and Engineering Cadets of Merchant Navy. The Academy develops world-class Marine Cadets, Marine Officers and Marine Engineers for national & foreign flagged ships engaged in international voyages. 

It has a Partnering Relation with World Maritime University (WMU), Malmö, Sweden since 2019 (was a Branch of WMU since 1990 till 2019) and also has an affiliation for Bachelor of Maritime Science Degree course for the Pre-Sea Cadets with Bangabandhu Sheikh Mujibur Rahman Maritime University, Bangladesh since 2013. 

Its education is recognized by IMO (UN), European Union (EMSA), UK Merchant Navy Training Board, Nautical Institute London & Institute of Marine Engineering, Science and Technology (IMarEST) London, Global Maritime Education and Training association (Australia) and has ISO 9001:2015 Quality Certificate by DNV-GL.

History

World scenario was changing fast after the WWII (1939–46). West Pakistan along with East Bengal (Bangladesh) became independent in 1947 from British rule. Thereafter, the then Pakistan Government looked into developing various industrial training facilities. As such a scheme for establishing a marine academy beside Bay of Bengal had been sanctioned in 1952. Juldia Point (valleys of Juldia-Rangadia) at the Karnaphuly river-mouth at Bay of Bengal was chosen for the planned academy. Interesting to note that the reason was to create a ‘ship-like environment’ due to geographical location the Juldia Point was considered as it was almost like a ship but not floating! Such suitable facility/location was unique in the country and was not available from Suez to South-East Asian countries except India. (Project Plan – Development of Marine Academy, Phase – II [1973-1980])

Building basic infrastructure commenced. The establishment budget was Taka 31.19 lakhs in 1952, then increased to Taka 53 lakhs in 1959 and finally to Taka 58.3 lakhs in 1961. The initial project was completed with the aim of training 22 Nautical Cadet Officers and 22 Marine Engineering Cadet Officers. The new-built ‘Mercantile Marine Academy’ went into functioning from 3 September 1962.

Afterwards, during our Great Liberation War 1971 the then Pakistan Government shifted the academy's function to Karachi leaving this academy abandoned. Immediately after liberation, Bangabandhu Sheikh Mujibur Rahman resumed it as Marine Academy with appointing Capt. (Merchant Marine) M L Rahman as the Commandant (first Bangladeshi Commandant). Bangabandhu also took a project titled "Development of Marine Academy (1973-1980)" and could raise the academy at the forefront of maritime professional excellence in South Asia.

Bangladesh Government recently has established four more Marine Academies in Barisal, Pabna, Sylhet and Rangpur of Bangladesh that have commenced functioning from 2021.

Courses

BSc courses
 BSc in Nautical Science
4 year Bachelor of Maritime Science
  
 Pre-Sea Nautical Science:24 months at Academy (1-4 semester)
   On Board Training: 12 months sea-service (5-6 semester)
1 year in academy (7-8 semester)

 BSc in Marine Engineering 
4 years Bachelor of Maritime Science
  
 Pre-Sea Marine Engineering:24 months at Academy (1-4 semester)
 On-Board Training:12 months sea service (5-6 semester)
1 year in academy under(7-8)semester

Preparatory courses
 Preparatory Course for Deck Officer Class I (Orals)
 Preparatory Course for Deck Officer Class II & I
 Preparatory Course for Deck Officer Class III
 Preparatory Course for Deck Officer Class IV (Orals)
 Preparatory Course for Deck Officer Class IV & V

IMO model courses
 Personal Survival Techniques (PST)
 Elementary First Aid (EFA)
 Fire Prevention & Fire Fighting (FP&FF)
 Personal Safety & Social Responsibilities (PSSR)
 Proficiency in Survival Craft &Rescue Boats (PSC&RB)
 Advanced Fire Fighting (AFF)
 Global Maritime Distress & Safety System (GMDSS)
 Standard Swimming Test (SST)
 Radar & ARPA
 Training for Trainer

Campus

The campus area is 100 acres. The campus includes:
 Two jetties at the both side of river Karnaphuly.
 Parade ground, football grounds, basketball grounds, volleyball grounds.
 Cadet Block and post-sea block, Commandant's house, Instructors houses
 Separate dining hall for cadets and instructors.
 Admin block, Instructional block, Eletro-navigational block, Workshop, auditorium
 Marine Academy primary School, Marine academy School and College
 Swimming pool, lake, recreation hill.
 Bangladesh Maritime Museum, Seafarers' Memorial

Academic facilities

Simulators
Presently there are two types of simulators:
 GMDSS
 Radar abd Arpa Simulator With ECDIS
Bridge room simulator

Laboratories
Electrical Lab
Mechanical Lab
Physics Lab
Computer Lab
Pneumatic Lab

Workshops
There are two workshops with various machineries

Other facilities
 Fire fighting center
 Auditorium
 Training boats
Swimming pool
Football ground 
Basketball ground

Notable alumni
 Abdul Awal Mintoo -graduated 1968.

See also
 Bangladesh Marine Fisheries Academy
 Bangladesh Naval Academy

References

Colleges in Bangladesh
Colleges in Chittagong
Buildings and structures in Chittagong
1962 establishments in East Pakistan